Louis Heilprin (1851–1912) was a Hungarian American author, historian, and encyclopedia editor. He was born in Miskolc, Hungary in 1851. His father, Michael, son of Phineas Mendel, was also an encyclopedist and scholar of Hebrew history and literature and a follower of Lajos Kossuth. He had a younger brother Angelo who was a professor at the Philadelphia Academy of Sciences and two sisters. The family left Hungary as refugees in 1856. Heilprin was educated by his father.

Louis and his father were both contributors to the American Encyclopedia, Century Encyclopedia of Names, New International Encyclopedia, and Lippincott's Pronouncing Gazetteer. He also wrote articles for The Evening Post and The Nation.

Books

References

External links
 

1851 births
1912 deaths
People from Miskolc
Hungarian Jews
Hungarian emigrants to the United States
20th-century American historians
American encyclopedists
19th-century American historians